Cașin may refer to the following places in Romania:

 Cașin, a commune in Bacău County
 Cașin (Râul Negru), a tributary of the Râul Negru in Covasna County
 Cașin (Trotuș), a tributary of the Trotuș in Bacău County
 Mănăstirea Cașin, a commune in Bacău County, Romania
 Cașin Church, a Romanian Orthodox church located in Bucharest, Romania